doa (バンド) (read as "doe-ah") is a Japanese rock band under the Giza Studio label. The band is named after a single letter of each of the members' names: Daiki Yoshimoto, Shinichiro Ohta, and Akihito Tokunaga.

Biography
Before the band formation, Akihito and Shinichiro were active as a musicians during 90's. Akihito provided arrangements for various Being Inc. artist, guitar support in television live appearances, was leader vocalist of band XL. Shinichiro was guitarist and composer in bands Baad and Rad Hammer.
In June 2004, the band has debut with mini album "Deadstock" under indies label Tent House. In July 2004, they've made major debut with single Hi no Tori no you ni under music major label Giza Studio. Akihito is in the production of compositions and arrangements, Shinichiro is in the production of lyrics and Daiki sometimes provide English lyrics in their single's B-side tracks.
In 2008, their single Glass no Highway debuted on number 7 at Oricon Daily Singles Charts, which makes their best debuted single during their career as of 2019. The single was promoted as an ending theme for Anime television series Golgo 13.
In 2010, they've participated in Christmas cover album "Christmas Non-Stop Carol" along with other Giza and Tent House artists.
In March 2011, they've released final CD single Now and Forever, after then they've releasing only digital singles. On the same month, they did their first hole live tour Doa Live “open_door” 2011 Spring and during the event released non-paid digital single We are one.
In years 2012–2016, during their live performances they sold charity goods in order to donate for victims of the Great East Japan Earthquake with total financial support of more than one million yen.
In 2017, after thirteen years of their debut, they've released their first live DVD Doa 12th Winter Live“open_door”2016.
In 2019, for the celebration of 15th debut anniversary they've scheduled to release three compilation albums which consist of track selection based on fan inquiries. As the part of promotion, they'll release three digital singles which will be part of each compilation album included as a new song.

Members
  - vocals, lyricist
  - guitar, vocals, composer, lyricist
  - bass, vocals, composer, lyricist, arranger

Discography 
So far they've released 23 singles, 8 digital singles, 10 albums, 1 best of, 1 indies album and 1 live DVD.

Albums

Singles

Digital Singles

Best Album

Indies Album

DVD

See also 
J-Rock

References

External links
doa official Web site 	

Being Inc. artists
Japanese hard rock musical groups
Japanese rock music groups
Japanese pop music groups
Japanese folk rock groups